Alessandro Salvatore Perez (born March 31, 1987) is an American-born Puerto Rican footballer.

External links
Lynn University bio

1987 births
Living people
Puerto Rican footballers
Puerto Rico international footballers
Baton Rouge Capitals players
USL League Two players
Lynn Fighting Knights men's soccer players
Puerto Rican people of Italian descent
Soccer players from Austin, Texas
Association football goalkeepers
Puerto Rico Islanders players
Puerto Rican expatriate sportspeople in Mexico
Expatriate footballers in Mexico
Puerto Rican expatriate footballers